Riceville is an unincorporated community and census-designated place (CDP) in McMinn County, Tennessee, United States. It is located some 60 miles southwest of Knoxville, and midway between Knoxville and Chattanooga, and in closer proximity, between Athens and Calhoun. Its population was 1,140 as of the 2020 census.

Demographics

Education
McMinn County Schools operates public schools, including Riceville Elementary School.

Riceville  Is almost home to private Christian school  Valley Christian Academy (K-8) it will be expanding into a high school as well to cater to grades 9–12.

References

External links
Google map

Census-designated places in McMinn County, Tennessee
Unincorporated communities in Tennessee
Census-designated places in Tennessee
Unincorporated communities in McMinn County, Tennessee